Aleksandra Stach (born 6 January 2000) is a Polish slalom canoeist who has competed at the international level since 2015.

She won two medals in the mixed C2 event at the ICF Canoe Slalom World Championships with a gold in 2018 and a silver in 2019. Her partner in the mixed C2 boat is also her coach Marcin Pochwała.

Stach represented Poland in the inaugural edition of the C1 event at the 2020 Summer Olympics in Tokyo, after Poland was reallocated the Oceania quota. She finished in 19th place after being eliminated in the heats.

World Cup individual podiums

References

External links

2000 births
Living people
Polish female canoeists
Medalists at the ICF Canoe Slalom World Championships
Place of birth missing (living people)
Canoeists at the 2020 Summer Olympics
Olympic canoeists of Poland
21st-century Polish women